Mănescu is a Romanian surname. Notable people with the surname include:

 Corneliu Mănescu (1916–2000), Romanian diplomat
 Manea Mănescu (1916–2009), Romanian politician
 Ramona Mănescu (born 1972), Romanian politician and lawyer

Romanian-language surnames